The Erasmus House, also known as the Erasmus House Museum, is a museum in Anderlecht, a municipality of Brussels, Belgium, devoted to the Dutch humanist writer and theologian Erasmus of Rotterdam.

Erasmus stayed in the house for five months from May to October 1521, working on his translation of his Novum Testamentum from Greek into Latin.

The house was converted to a museum in 1931. Its garden is split into two parts that both try to adhere to the spirit of Erasmus; one through art and philosophy and the other, designed by the landscape architect , through typical medicinal plants from the 16th century. The complex was designated a historic monument in 1938. This site is served by Saint-Guidon/Sint-Guido metro station on line 5 of the Brussels Metro.

History

Construction
The red-bricked building known today as the Erasmus House was constructed in stages between 1460 and 1515 in late Gothic or early Renaissance style. This property was once the country estate of the family of Brussels bankers and money changers Suweel. At that time, Anderlecht was still a village in the outskirts of Brussels counting barely 300 inhabitants.

Enclosed by a brick wall, the house consists of several wings. The oldest part, high, narrow, with a gently sloping roof, was built around 1460 by Peeter Wijchmans, official money changer of the City of Brussels. The date of construction of the building's lowest part is unknown; however, it is known that it was used as a stable at the end of the 16th century. It now houses the museum's reception. The ensemble is preceded by an interior courtyard.

A man of culture, Canon Wijchmans gladly welcomed scholars and intellectuals to his residence in Anderlecht, among them the famous Dutch humanist writer and theologian Erasmus of Rotterdam with whom a friendship was established. It is possible that Erasmus, a great traveller, stayed several times with his friend Wijchmans, but it is from his five-month stay from May to October 1521 that traces remain.

Visit of Erasmus (1521)

Departing from the nearby Flemish town of Leuven, where he lectured at the University, Erasmus arrived in Anderlecht in May 1521. This move was first of all made for health reasons as he suffered from persistent fevers, and as he wrote himself, believed the country life would do him good. In September 1521, he sent these words to the French scholar and humanist Guillaume Budé: 

There were also political and religious reasons behind his decision; Martin Luther had just been excommunicated (1520) and the reformer's sympathisers were hunted down. In addition, Erasmus's attitude towards the Roman Catholic ecclesiastical institution aroused strong criticism at the time from traditional theologians. His books and ideas contributed to the blossoming Protestant Reformation by advocating a personal faith and the active practice of evangelical values, though he never became a Protestant himself and died within the Catholic faith. Erasmus thus considered it prudent to move away from the University of Leuven, a place of passionate theological debates, for protection, by getting closer to the court of the young emperor Charles V, established at the Coudenberg Palace in the heart of Brussels, to whom he had been appointed adviser a few years earlier. 

During his time in Anderlecht, Erasmus worked on a copy of his Novum Testamentum with a view to editing a new translation from Greek into Latin. For the same reasons of personal safety, however, Erasmus left Anderlecht for Basel in October 1521, after just five months.

Later history
In the aftermath of the French Revolution, the Erasmus House became a civilian residence before it was purchased, in 1931, by the local council, which turned it into a museum dedicated to the great Renaissance figure. Following a restoration campaign led by the architect Charles Van Elst in a spirit of the purest historicism, the Erasmus House Museum was inaugurated on 24 September 1932. The house was classified as a historic monument on 25 October 1938, and the garden was inscribed on the safeguard list as a site in 1998.

Museum
The museum is dedicated to Erasmus's life and work and evokes the intellectual world of the Renaissance through a collection of artworks presented in an interior reconstituted using Gothic and Renaissance furniture. The core of the collection is made up of numerous 16th-century books, retracing the thought of this humanist who deeply marked European civilisation. In addition to an important collection of Erasmus's writings, the museum also houses paintings by Hans Holbein the Younger, Hieronymus Bosch, Albrecht Dürer, Cornelis Massijs and Joos van Cleve, as well as 17th-century murals. Furthermore, there are various sculptures, historical furniture, as well as a study centre. Special exhibitions and cultural events also take place there on a regular basis.

The museum is open every day except Mondays from 10 a.m. to 6 p.m. On the first Sunday of every month, admission to the museum is free.

Rhetoric Room

Located on the ground floor, the Rhetoric Room is the place where, according to tradition, Erasmus received visitors. Above the fireplace hangs a painting of Adrian VI, canon of the chapter of Anderlecht, tutor to the future Charles V and the only pope from the Netherlands.

Work cabinet
A room overlooking the garden which was Erasmus's study. A seat and writing desk recreate the atmosphere of the time. The work table is not that of Erasmus since the latter wrote standing on a lectern or dictated a lot of his texts to famulis (i.e. secretaries). A series of portraits of the humanist have been collected there, including famous paintings by Quentin Matsys, Hans Holbein and Albrecht Dürer. Erasmus's correspondence shows that he was in contact with the great personalities of his time: Thomas More, Francis I, Charles V, and Martin Luther, to name a few.

Renaissance Room
The Renaissance Room, lined with Córdoba leather with gold leaf prints, is adorned with Flemish school paintings of the 15th and 16th centuries, such as ones by Hieronymus Bosch, Quentin Matsys, and Pieter Huys. In the middle of the ceiling hangs an impressive wrought iron chandelier. The space between the windows of the room has been gradually reduced in order to give the room an appearance of perspective (clearly visible from the outside).

White Room
The large upstairs room, called the "White Room" or "Frescoes Room", now painted purple, may have been the dining room. The original editions of Erasmus's books, arranged according to the printers to whom they had been entrusted, were displayed there in showcases. They have now been replaced with copies. The first showcase exhibits numerous editions and translations of In Praise of Folly, the second one editions of the Colloquies. Another showcase contains books redacted by ecclesiastical censorship. Using the three classical languages in some of his writings (Latin, Greek and Hebrew) Erasmus worked with the best printers of his time, including Johann Froben of Basel, and personally revised the printing proofs. An imposing Flemish copper chandelier with a double row of lights also hung in the middle of the room. Pieces of frescoes, which probably lined the top of the room, have also been saved.

Gardens
The gardens of the Erasmus House date from different periods. The orchards from the beginning of the 20th century were converted into a garden by the architect Charles Van Elst and hosted the Belgian Outdoor Sculpture Biennials (1946–1966).

Medicinal garden
In 1987, the landscape designer  created a garden of medicinal plants. In this garden, inspired by the medieval walled garden and encapsulating the true botanical spirit of the humanist, around a hundred plants known to 16th-century doctors are cultivated.

Philosophical garden
In 2000, the landscape architect Benoit Fondu created a philosophical garden. This garden is located beyond the medicinal garden and is inspired by the conference The religious banquet written by Erasmus after his stay in Anderlecht (1521). A series of cartographic beds have been set up, in which visitors can admire the plants and flowers that Erasmus contemplated during his numerous travels. This garden also houses works created by contemporary artists including Catherine Beaugrand, Marie-Jo Lafontaine, as well as Perejaume and Bob Verschueren. The garden furniture and signage were made by Pierre Portier.

See also

 History of Brussels
 Culture of Belgium

References

Notes

Museums in Brussels
Anderlecht
Protected heritage sites in Brussels